Pasir Panjang MRT station is an underground Mass Rapid Transit (MRT) station on the Circle line. As the name suggests, it is located in Pasir Panjang at the southern part of Queenstown planning area, Singapore. This station is situated underneath Pasir Panjang Road and Labrador Viaduct (West Coast Highway), next to the Pasir Panjang Food Centre, Currency House and Pasir Panjang container terminal. It is also near the Reflections at Bukit Chandu, a museum near the site of the Battle of Pasir Panjang.

History

The station opened on 8 October 2011, as announced in August of that year.

Art in Transit
The artwork featured in this station is Lieutenant Adnan by Ho Tzu Nyen, installed under the Art in Transit programme. Located on the lift shaft in the station and around the station are mock posters for a fictional movie about Lieutenant Adnan bin Saidi (played by Singapore actor Aaron Aziz), a real-life war hero who fought in the Battle of Pasir Panjang during World War II.

References

External links

 

Railway stations in Singapore opened in 2011
Queenstown, Singapore
Mass Rapid Transit (Singapore) stations